Spark Plug is the second album by soul jazz guitarist Melvin Sparks which was recorded for the Prestige label in 1971.

Reception

AllMusic awarded the album 3 stars stating "It's more relaxed, funky, occasionally bluesy jazz with guitar and organ to the fore, very much of a piece with the Prestige soul-jazz "house" sound circa 1970".

Album was recently remastered by Jazz Dispensary and available from Vinyl Me, Please.  Other musicians on this album include Idris Muhammad, Leon Spencer, and Grover Washtington, Jr.

Track listing
All compositions by Melvin Sparks except where noted.
 "Who's Gonna Take the Weight" (Ronald Bell, George Brown, Robert Mickens, Claydes Charles Smith, Dennis Thomas, Richard Westfield) – 9:20
 "Spark Plug" – 8:50
 "Conjunction Mars" – 8:11
 "Alone Together" (Howard Dietz, Arthur Schwartz) – 4:14
 "Dig Dis" – 6:45
Recorded at Van Gelder Studio in Englewwod Cliffs New Jersey on March 1 (track 1) and March 8 (tracks 2-5), 1971

Personnel
Melvin Sparks – guitar
Virgil Jones – trumpet
Grover Washington, Jr. – tenor saxophone
Reggie Roberts (tracks 2-5), Leon Spencer (track 1) – organ
Idris Muhammad – drums
 Bob Porter – producer
 Rudy Van Gelder – engineer

References

Melvin Sparks albums
1971 albums
Prestige Records albums
Albums produced by Bob Porter (record producer)
Albums recorded at Van Gelder Studio